Jeff Beacher (born March 25, 1973) is an American producer, entrepreneur and master of ceremonies who created, produced and hosted the long running live theater series, Beacher’s Madhouse. Through his company Beacher Media Group he develops partnerships between celebrities and tech companies in Silicon Valley.

In 2004, then mayor Oscar Goodman awarded Jeff Beacher the key to the city of Las Vegas. Jeff Beacher and Beacher’s Madhouse productions have been featured on a variety of television series including VH1’s The Fabulous Life, Gene Simmons: Family Jewels, Paris Hilton's My New BFF, Jimmy Kimmel Live! and The Osbournes. He has been a consulting producer on several television specials, with past productions that include Pitbull's New Year's Revolution, Mariah Carey's Merriest Christmas, and was the Supervising Producer of The Gong Show with host Mike Myers.

Early Years 

Jeff Beacher was born in 1973 and adopted at birth by Dr. Fred and Shelly Beacher in Brooklyn, New York, before the family relocated to Woodmere, Long Island. He attended George W. Hewlett High School, alma mater of several Hollywood influencers including director Edward Burns, producer Howard Deutch and writer Brian Burns. During high school, he created several businesses including one that sold and distributed roses to classmates at his school and in the tri-state area. He also produced after-prom parties. On September 10, 2001 his mother, who at the time was battling terminal cancer, told him to pursue a career as a comedian. He quit his job selling furniture mainly after and started taking comedy classes.

During his career as a stand-up comedian, in 2002 he decided to produce his own comedy showcases selling out The Paramount Theater at The Madison Square Garden, and then  The Supper Club (now the Edison Ballroom) in New York City for over a year before hosting one final performance at The Paramount Theater at Madison Square Garden in 2003 prior to him relocating to Las Vegas. The early shows attracted top comedians of the 2000s including Jeff Ross, Artie Lange, Nick Swardson, Bill Burr, Robert Kelly, Bobby Lee, Steve Byrne and Ken Jeong, with whom he created the variety show, Kims of Comedy.

Career

Las Vegas 

In 2003 Jeff Beacher moved his operation to Las Vegas at the invitation of Harry Morton, founder of Pink Taco restaurants and the son of Peter Morton the owner of the Hard Rock Hotel and Casino. He was offered the hotel’s largest performance venue, The Joint, to create a unique and re-occurring variety show. In an effort to attract attention, upon arriving in Las Vegas and setting up his show, he dove into a mermaid themed fish tank inside the MGM Grand Las Vegas at the Rainforest Cafe on December 11, 2003, the same night as the Billboard Music Awards. His first show at The Joint debuted a few weeks after the incident on December 30, 2003.

Originally titled, Beacher's Comedy Madhouse, by the time he'd begun receiving national media attention in 2004, the name had been shortened to Beacher’s Madhouse and became a popular celebrity and tourist vaudeville-style attraction in Las Vegas until 2008 (and then resumed in 2013 at the MGM Grand Hotel and Casino). During his tenure in Las Vegas, Jeff Beacher and Beacher’s Madhouse received global attention for both the variety and uniqueness of performers in each show and the celebrity support he and the show received. Equally as newsworthy were the unplanned spontaneous events that occurred including a highly publicized fight on April 8, 2006, between two rival all-dwarf KISS cover bands. The event was covered in depth on programs like The Daily Show and Howard Stern

Eventually Beacher’s Madhouse moved to a residency at the MGM Grand Hotel and Casino where it remained until 2015. Though he'd agreed to a twenty-year, one hundred million dollar deal with the hotel, his health was declining due to tremendous stress and weight gain. In 2014 he was reported to have weighed over 400 pounds and was suffering from a variety of health problems. That year while performing as “Big Britney” a characterization of Britney Spears he himself portrayed in drag, he collapsed and was hospitalized.

Beacher’s Madhouse Tour 

In 2008, Jeff Beacher took his variety show on an 81 city tour entitled Beacher’s Costume Ball Tour, and in 2009, the show became a featured act on the Warped Tour and Mayhem Festival. The Costume Ball Tour was in partnership with MySpace and enjoyed sold-out performances across America in a variety of venues from hotels, to nightclubs, to theaters. The first sold-out shows were in Shreveport, Louisiana, with a reported audience of over 2,000. Other cities on the tour included Dallas, Chicago, Miami, and San Diego. The tour included a fixed set of acts which offered a variety of performers as well as local artists who were hired along the route. Included were the Tiny KISS and Tiny Saturday Night Fever dancers.

On Friday, December 27, 2013 he re-opened his weekly show in Las Vegas at the MGM Grand Hotel and Casino with special guest host Miley Cyrus

Beacher’s Madhouse Los Angeles 

Because of health concerns, Jeff Beacher relocated to Los Angeles where he'd already established a secondary Beacher’s Madhouse at The Hollywood Roosevelt Hotel in Hollywood in 2009. Beacher's Madhouse was located inside the famed Cinegrill nightclub that was once home to the Academy Awards in the hotel’s basement. Beacher's Madhouse in Los Angeles was a highly popularized theater that attracted a wide variety of celebrities including Katy Perry, Selena Gomez, Britney Spears, Miley Cyrus, Paris Hilton, George Clooney, Sandra Bullock, Quentin Tarantino, Demi Lovato, Leonardo DiCaprio, Michael B. Jordan and Zac Efron

References

External links
Jeff Beacher/Beacher Media Group Official Site

Living people
1973 births
People from Woodmere, New York
George W. Hewlett High School alumni
Television producers from New York (state)
American male comedians
21st-century American comedians
Comedians from New York (state)